A bladeless fan, also known as an Air multiplier fan, is a fan that blows air from a ring or oval opening with no external blades. Its vanes are hidden in its pedestal and direct the collected airflow through a toroid, blowing a thin high-velocity smooth airflow from a continuous slot across the surface of the tube or toroid.

The concept was created by Toshiba in 1981 and was later popularized by industrial designer James Dyson, who used the technique in a consumer fan introduced in 2009, calling it the Air Multiplier. It was included in Time's 50 Best Inventions of 2009 list. The principle has been in use for a long time as an ejector or injector.

History 

The first concept was created by Toshiba in 1981. It was later popularized by industrial designer James Dyson, who used the technique in a consumer fan introduced in 2009, calling it the Air Multiplier.

Design 
Air flows through the channel in the pedestal and upwards into the ring. Then the air is shot out through a 16-mm slit at the edge of the ring. This air flows smoothly, rather than turbulently as with a conventional fan. The curvature of the inner wall creates an area of negative pressure like an airplane wing to draw more air into the flow, hence "multiplying" it. This action is called entrainment. The ambient air surrounding the ring flows with the direction of the air exiting the slit (is "entrained" to it). Dyson claims that its fan's air output is at least 15 times greater than the air volume entering the pedestal.

Performance 

The Spanish consumer advocate Organización de Consumidores y Usuarios tested Dyson's first Air Multiplier (AM01) and remarked on the further-reaching and steadier stream. It was found to use 40W and move  at its maximum setting. However, it was noisier and much more expensive (€300–€400 versus €20) than bladed fans.

Geek.com performed airflow, noise level, and power measurements on the AM06 and, aside from the first setting, was found to achieve similar levels of air speed and air volume moved per second while being quieter (2–10dB) and more energy efficient per volume of air moved (6–3×) depending on the setting. The volume was on par with an $80 regular fan and about twice as much as a $15 fan, while the air speed was roughly on par with both. At this setting, the AM06 produced 10dB less noise than either regular fan and used 20W, versus 60W and 40W used by the regular models. It concludes that while "there is more to the air multiplier than a bit of fancy plastic", "this data probably won't convince anyone to buy a Dyson AM06". The product review concluded that, primarily, "the Dyson is for doctor's offices, executive suites, and other places where air flow is nice to have, but design is paramount."

References

See also 
Air purifier
 Dyson Air-purifiers with bladeless fan

Ventilation fans
21st-century inventions
British inventions